Will Caldwell is an Australian rugby union footballer who currently plays for the New South Wales Waratahs in the international Super Rugby competition as a lock.

Career
Will Caldwell was named vice-captain for the Waratahs clashes with the Czech Republic and Romania on a tour of Eastern Europe. In 2005, he was named on the bench against the Blues.

A member of the Sydney University tight-five, he joined the Waratahs.

In 2005 he made his Super Rugby debut against Queensland.  By the end of the 2006 season, Caldwell had accumulated a total of 11 caps for the Waratahs, and had scored one try. On 10 July 2006 he was called up to play for Australia A.

References

External links
Waratahs profile

Living people
1982 births
Australian rugby union players
University of Sydney alumni
People from Young, New South Wales
New South Wales Waratahs players
Rugby union players from New South Wales
Rugby union locks